Ofentse Arthur Boloko (born 12 May 1992 in Pretoria, South Africa) is a South African rugby union player. His regular position is winger.

Career

Youth

Boloko earned his first provincial colours in 2005 when he was selected to represent Border at the Under-13 Craven Week competition. In 2008, he once again represented Border at the Under-16 Grant Khomo Week competition, which also resulted in him being included in a South African Under-16 Elite Squad. He also played for them at the premier school tournament in South Africa, the Craven Week in both 2009 and 2010.

He then moved to Durban to join the  Academy prior to the 2011 season. During his spell there, he made three appearances for the  side during the 2011 Under-19 Provincial Championship.

Eastern Province Kings

He appeared for the  side during the 2012 and 2013 Under-21 Provincial Championships.

In 2013, he was named in the Eastern Province Kings' squad for the 2013 Vodacom Cup, but failed to make an appearance. His first class debut came a year later during the 2014 Vodacom Cup competition.

He was released by the Kings when his contract expired at the end of 2014.

References

South African rugby union players
Living people
1992 births
Rugby union players from Pretoria
Rugby union wings
Eastern Province Elephants players